Zoltán Horváth (born 1 November 1954) is a Hungarian equestrian. He competed in two events at the 1980 Summer Olympics.

References

External links
 

1954 births
Living people
Hungarian male equestrians
Olympic equestrians of Hungary
Equestrians at the 1980 Summer Olympics
People from Sárvár
Sportspeople from Vas County